Ed Waters (September 23, 1930 – October 30, 2004) was an American writer for film and television.

He co-wrote Sorority Girl, wrote an episode of the television series The Lieutenant, and won an Emmy Award in 1976.

Filmography

Films

Television

References

External links

2004 deaths
1930 births
American television writers
Emmy Award winners
American male television writers
20th-century American screenwriters
20th-century American male writers